Joshua A. Barro is an American journalist and creator of the newsletter and podcast Very Serious. He previously hosted the weekly radio program Left, Right, & Center based at KCRW Los Angeles and served as a senior editor and columnist at Business Insider.

Early life
Barro is the son of Harvard University professor and macroeconomist Robert Barro. After growing up in Massachusetts, Barro received a bachelor's degree in psychology from Harvard University. While in college, he spent a summer interning for Grover Norquist.

Career
Barro previously worked as a senior fellow at the Manhattan Institute for Policy Research, as a real estate banker for Wells Fargo, as the lead writer for The Ticker (a defunct economics and politics blog hosted by Bloomberg L.P.), and as the politics editor at Business Insider.

He appears regularly on Bloomberg Television and MSNBC and has appeared on Real Time with Bill Maher on HBO and on All In with Chris Hayes on MSNBC.  He is the former host, moderator and center of the weekly political roundtable radio show Left, Right & Center, based at KCRW Los Angeles and heard on public radio stations across the U.S.

In early 2013, he was a prominent supporter of a potential trillion-dollar coin, but by late 2013, he had changed his mind.

Time named Barro's Twitter feed one of "The 140 Best Twitter Feeds of 2013," one of ten in the Politics category. In 2012, Forbes selected him as one of the "30 Under 30" media "brightest stars under the age of 30," and David Brooks listed him as part of the "vibrant and increasingly influential center-right conversation." A former aide to Barack Obama included Barro on a short list of Obama's favorite columnists.

In 2014, Barro left Business Insider to join The New York Times "The Upshot." In 2016, Barro was rehired by Business Insider as a senior editor. In 2018, he again left Business Insider to become a business columnist at New York magazine. In 2020, he announced that he was rejoining Business Insider as a columnist covering politics, business, and the economy.

In early 2022, Barro left Business Insider and stepped down as host of Left, Right & Center to pursue his newsletter and podcast Very Serious.

Political views
Early in his career, Barro described himself as Republican but was critical of many of the party's policies. He also identified as a neoliberal. Barro has spoken out strongly against traditional Christian beliefs regarding homosexuality, stating that they "linger and oppress" and must be "stamped out ruthlessly".

After the 2012 United States elections, Barro became increasingly critical of the Republican Party and wrote that "the party's economic agenda, as embodied in the latest Ryan budget, is simply terrible for the vast majority of Americans." Barro called Congressional Republicans "crazy and awful". Reactions by other conservatives in the media led The Atlantic to name Barro "the loneliest Republican". Ezra Klein said that, based on Barro's views, "He doesn't come across as much of a Republican."

On October 11, 2016, following the Republican Party's nomination of Donald Trump for president, Barro said he had left the Republican Party and registered as a Democrat. Barro cited as reasons for his decision the "fact-free environment so many of its voters live in, and because of the anti-Democrat hysteria that had been willfully whipped up by so many of its politicians," which created a "vulnerability in our democracy."

Hamburger problem 
Barro argues that progressives in the United States have what he calls a hamburger problem, by which he means they sanctimoniously scold the public about a host of inconsequential personal choices, such as eating ground beef burgers (it is unhealthy, harms animals, and contributes to global warming, among others). They have become in his words a movement of "moralizing busybodies", which harms their political appeal. He said: "All this scolding—this messaging that you should feel guilty about aspects of your life that you didn't think were anyone else's business—leads to a weird outcome when you go to vote in November."

Personal life 
Barro lives in Manhattan and is openly gay. In 2017, he married Zachary Allen, chairman of TIPAH Consulting and a former Democratic National Committee official. He is an atheist.

See also 
 List of LGBT people from New York City
 New Yorkers in journalism

References

1984 births
American atheists
American male journalists
American political writers
American gay writers
Harvard College alumni
American LGBT journalists
Living people
MSNBC people
New York (state) Democrats
The New York Times people
Manhattan Institute for Policy Research
21st-century American male writers
21st-century American journalists
American columnists